The 1991–92 Sheffield Shield season was the 90th season of the Sheffield Shield, the domestic first-class cricket competition of Australia. Western Australia won the championship.

Table

Final

References

Sheffield Shield
Sheffield Shield
Sheffield Shield seasons